Tibor Jančula (born 16 June 1969) is a former Slovak football striker who played mostly for DAC Dunajská Streda and Slovan Bratislava in Slovakia.

Jančula made 29 appearances and scored 9 goals for the Slovakia national football team from 1995 to 2001.

International goals

References

External links
 
 

Living people
1969 births
Slovak footballers
Slovakia international footballers
Czech First League players
FK Viktoria Žižkov players
ŠK Slovan Bratislava players
Ferencvárosi TC footballers
Fortuna Düsseldorf players
FC Red Bull Salzburg players
K.S.K. Beveren players
Slovak Super Liga players
2. Bundesliga players
Association football forwards
People from Senec District
Sportspeople from the Bratislava Region
FC DAC 1904 Dunajská Streda players